Foreign forced labor was used by the Soviet Union during and in the aftermath of World War II, which continued up to 1950s.

There have been two categories of foreigners amassed for forced labor: prisoners of war and civilians. Both of them were handled by GUPVI, a special department of NKVD, analogous to GULAG, which was established in September 1939, after the start of the Soviet invasion of Poland.

See also
Forced labor of Germans in the Soviet Union
Forced labor of Hungarians in the Soviet Union
Japanese prisoners of war in the Soviet Union
Italian prisoners of war in the Soviet Union
Romanian prisoners of war in the Soviet Union

References

Forced migration
Unfree labor in the Soviet Union
Aftermath of World War II in the Soviet Union
World War II prisoners of war held by the Soviet Union
Unfree labor during World War II
Social history of Romania
Foreign relations of the Soviet Union